Archia was an ancient deme on the island of Cos. Its capital was Antimachia.

References

Populated places in the ancient Aegean islands
Former populated places in Greece
Kos